Meir Shlomo (born 1954, Tel Aviv) is the Israeli Ambassador to Thailand with non-resident status in Cambodia. and was the Israeli Consul to both Houston (2010–2015) and New England (2002–2006).

Biography
He was born and raised in Tel Aviv but his grandparents emigrated to Jerusalem in 1927 from Aden (later called the Democratic Republic of South Yemen).

Shlomo earned a Ph.D. in history and communication from the University of Paris VIII and a Master’s degree in mass communication from the Hebrew University of Jerusalem. He also has a Bachelor’s Degree in Political Science from Tel Aviv University.

References

Ambassadors of Israel to Cambodia
Ambassadors of Israel to Thailand
Israeli consuls
1954 births
Living people
Hebrew University of Jerusalem Faculty of Social Sciences alumni
University of Paris alumni
Tel Aviv University alumni